The basilar plexus (transverse or basilar sinus) consists of several interlacing venous channels between the layers of the dura mater over the basilar part of the occipital bone (the clivus), and serves to connect the two inferior petrosal sinuses.

It communicates with the anterior vertebral venous plexus.

References

Veins of the head and neck